People Who Travel (French: Les Gens du voyage) is a 1938 French-German film directed by Jacques Feyder. The film was a co-production with a separate German version Travelling People also released. It is a circus film.

It was shot at the Bavaria Studios in Munich. The film's sets were designed by the art director Jean D'Eaubonne.

Plot 
Due to an accident at the Barlay Circus, animal trainer Flora finds Fernand, a former prison escapee, and refers him to manager, Edouard Barlay. The son of Flora (and Fernand), Marcel, does the acrobatics with the manager's daughters, Suzanne and Yvonne. In love with the latter, Suzanne becomes jealous. Squire Pepita is also interested in the young man.

Cast 
Françoise Rosay: La dompteuse Flora
André Brulé: Fernand
Marie Glory: Pepita
Guillaume de Sax: Le directeur Edouard Barlay
Sylvia Bataille: Yvonne Barlay
Louise Carletti: Suzanne Barlay
Fabien Loris: Marcel
André Roanne: Le lieutenant de gendarmerie
Yves Deniaud: Le bonimenteur
Daniel Mendaille: Jo
Georges Prieur: Gaëtan
Yvonne Gall: Laëtitia
André Nicolle: Le vétérinaire
Lucien Brulé: Tino
Alfred Adam: le médecin (not credited)
 And Raymond Aimos, Maurice Baquet, Jean Sinoël, Pierre Labry, Madeleine Sologne (not credited) ...

Crew 
Written: Jacques Feyder and Jacques Viot
Dialogue: Bernard Zimmer
Photography: Franz Koch
Décor: Jean d'Eaubonne
Editing: Roger Mercanton
Music: Wolfgang Zeller
Assistant technician: André Roanne
Producers: Société Films Sonores Tobis - Filmkunst Berlin
Genre: Tragedy - Black and white - 121 mn

German version 

As was common at the time, the film was also filmed at studios in Munich in an alternative version, French and German, the technical team and stars being more or less different in each version.

Only Françoise Rosay kept her role as Flora in the German version, while other stars were: Hans Albers (Fernand), Camilla Horn (Pepita), Herbert Hübner (Edouard Barlay), Irene von Meyendorff (Yvonne Barlay), Ulla Ganglitz (Suzanne Barlay), Hannes Stelzer (Marcel), Aribert Mog (Le lieutenant).

Production
Françoise Rosay refused to have a stunt double in scenes in which she was confronted by lions (cited by Jacques Siclier in Télérama in 1992).

External links 
 
 

1938 films
1938 drama films
Circus films
Films directed by Jacques Feyder
French drama films
Films of Nazi Germany
1930s French-language films
Films shot at Bavaria Studios
French multilingual films
French black-and-white films
German drama films
German black-and-white films
1938 multilingual films
Tobis Film films
1930s French films
1930s German films